Abraham Sheppard was a merchant-planter, sheriff, legislator, and officer during the American Revolutionary War from North Carolina.  He lived in Dobbs County, North Carolina on a plantation called Contentnea.

Civilian career
Abraham's ancestors were from Surry County, Virginia, where he may have been born.  The date of his birth is not known for sure but could be about 1730.  Abraham Sheppard was a merchant-planter and owned a plantation, Contentnea, in Dobbs County, North Carolina. He had at least three sons (Benjamin, Abraham Jr., and John), and four daughters, one of whom (Pherebe or Phoebe Sheppard) married Colonel James Glasgow, a fellow colonel in the North Carolina militia.  Abraham became a widower with three small daughters by his first wife and married the sister of James Glasgow, Martha Jones Glasgow.  They had a large family.  Abraham died in or after 1790.

His civilian career included the following offices:  
 1759, appointed as justice of the peace for Dobbs County, North Carolina
 1760 and 1769 served in the Province of North Carolina Assembly
 1775, 1776, served in Third, Fourth, and Fifth North Carolina Provincial Congress
 1780-1781, served in the North Carolina House of Commons 
 1784, served as member of the North Carolina Council of State
 1783 to 1790, served as chairman of the Court of Pleas and Quarter Sessions for Dobbs County

Military service
Sheppard served during the American Revolution:
 1777-1778, Dobbs County Regiment
 September 9, 1775, promoted to Colonel in the North Carolina Militia.  
 November 23, 1776, Colonel/ Commandant of the newly-created 1st Battalion of Volunteers, which was disbanded on 4/10/1777.  
 April 17, 1777, Colonel/ Commandant of the 10th North Carolina Regiment  
 June 1, 1778, retired from military service

His son, John Sheppard, served with him as a Captain, Major and Lieutenant Colonel in the Dobbs County regiment and as Major in the 10th North Carolina Regiment.  He was given the command as colonel of the Wayne County Regiment established in 1779.  His son Abraham Sheppard Jr. also served with him in the 10th North Carolina Regiment as a Captain.

References

Bibliography
 Fred A. Berg, Encyclopedia of Continental Army Units (1972)
 John L. Cheney Jr., ed., North Carolina Government, 1585–1974 (1975).
 Walter Clark, ed., State Records of North Carolina, vols. 11–13, 16, 22 (1896–1907).
 Talmage Johnson and Charles R. Holloman, The Story of Kinston and Lenoir County (1954).
 Military Collections (North Carolina State Archives, Raleigh).
 Hugh F. Rankin, North Carolina Continentals (1971).
 Phillips Russell, North Carolina in the Revolutionary War (1965).
 William L. Saunders, ed., Colonial Records of North Carolina, vols. 8–10 (1890).

North Carolina sheriffs
North Carolina militiamen in the American Revolution
People from Dobbs County, North Carolina
Members of the North Carolina Provincial Congresses
Members of the North Carolina House of Representatives
Continental Army officers from North Carolina